() is a Japanese sports equipment and sportswear company, founded in Osaka in 1906 by Rihachi Mizuno. Today, Mizuno is a global corporation which makes a wide variety of sports equipment and sportswear for badminton, baseball, boxing, cycling, association football, gridiron football, futsal, golf, judo, rugby, running, skiing, athletics, swimming, table tennis, tennis and volleyball.

History
Mizuno was founded in 1906 as Mizuno Brothers, Ltd. by Rihachi Mizuno and his younger brother Rizo, in Osaka. The shop sold Western sundries, including baseballs, and then in 1907 began to sell order-made athletic wear. In 1910 the shop moved to Umeda-Shinmichi and its name was changed to Mizuno Shop. In 1913 the firm began to manufacture baseballs and gloves. In 1933 Mizuno presented Star Line, the first Japanese made golf clubs. By 1935 its golf club showroom was the world's largest. In 1941 the company name was changed to Mizuno Co., Ltd, and has remained the same since. During World War II, Mizuno manufactured military ordnance for Japan's war effort.

The first American factory was established in Los Angeles, under the denomination American Mizuno in 1961. During the following years, Mizuno signed sponsorship deals with some of the most prominent personalities in sports, such as track and field athlete Carl Lewis, the All Blacks rugby team, former San Francisco 49ers quarterback Joe Montana, for most of his years in the NFL, the Manu Samoa rugby team, Czech tennis player Ivan Lendl, and golf player Nick Faldo and baseball Hall of Famer Rickey Henderson.

To gain a foothold in the baseball glove market in the United States, the mobile "Mizuno Baseball Workshop" was introduced in the late 1970s to service major league clubs during spring training in Arizona and Florida. The  van contained extensive leather-working equipment, manned by two skilled Japanese craftsmen, to produce made-to-order gloves and repair all brands.

The company also expanded its operation centres opening new factories in Germany, France, China, Scotland and Hong Kong.

Aircraft
To commemorate the company's 30th anniversary, the company began manufacturing gliders in 1936. Among the company's military design efforts included the Mizuno Shinryu, a proposed rocket-powered interceptor that never left the prototyping stages, and the Mizuno MXZ1, a training glider.

Golf
Mizuno is a manufacturer of golf clubs and accessories. Tiger Woods used Mizuno golf clubs until he signed a deal with Titleist and turned professional in 1996, but continued to play with Mizuno clubs for his first pro year and a half while waiting for his ideal set of clubs from Titleist; notably, he won his first Masters Tournament victory in 1997 with his Mizuno clubs. Other players have played using Mizuno equipment during their careers, including 13 of the 24 players who have ever held a men's #1 ranking (as of 2022).

Sponsorship

References

External links

 
 Mizuno USA

Athletic shoe brands
Clothing brands of Japan
Clothing companies established in 1906
Companies listed on the Tokyo Stock Exchange
Golf equipment manufacturers
Japanese brands
Japanese companies established in 1906
Manufacturing companies based in Osaka
Manufacturing companies established in 1906
Shoe companies of Japan
Sporting goods brands
Sporting goods manufacturers of Japan
Sportswear brands
Swimwear brands
Swimwear manufacturers